Vicente Castelló (c. 1585, Valencia - 1636, Valencia) was a Spanish painter in the Baroque style. He was a son-in-law of Francisco Ribalta, whose painting style was similar; as was that of his brother-in-law, Juan Ribalta, leading to a misattribution of many of his paintings. He was virtually forgotten until these errors were corrected.

Biography 
His father, Salvador, was a painter from Aragón who came to Valencia just before Vicente's birth. His mother, Jerónima Comes, was the daughter of Jerónimo Comes, also a painter. It is likely that his father worked, at least temporarily, for Francisco Ribalta. 

In 1616, he was inscribed on the list of the College of Painters. After 1620, he worked in Segorbe, together with Juan Ribalta and Abdón Castañeda. The three also created an altarpiece in Andilla, completed in 1626, and painted two images (now lost) for the chapel of the Communion at the Segorbe Cathedral. He is also credited with completing the Virgin of Porta-Coeli at the Porta Coeli Charterhouse (now at the  Museo de Bellas Artes de Valencia), which was begun by the elder Ribalta in 1625.

Both of the Ribaltas died in 1628, and Castelló took over the family workshop. In 1630, he was back in Segorbe, where he engaged in a challenge, from Pedro García Ferrer, to create a painting on the theme Story of the Innocents, entirely of their own invention; nothing copied from other sources. The loser would forfeit fifty Libras (Pounds). 

The last reference to Castelló is in 1635, from the papers of the Bishop of Segorbe, regarding a commission for a painting of The Last Supper.

Castelló's works may be distinguished by exaggerated foreshortenings with longer figures. His brushstrokes also lacked the precision of the Ribaltas' and he used darker colors for backgrounds. These features have helped to separate his works from theirs as well as some works formerly attributed to Pedro de Orrente.

References

Sources 
 Benito Doménech, Fernando (1987), Los Ribalta y la pintura valenciana de su tiempo, catálogo de la exposición, Valencia-Madrid, 
 Cinco siglos de pintura valenciana. Obras del Museo de Bellas Artes de Valencia (1996), Museo de Bellas Artes-Fundación Central Hispano 
 Kowal, David M., Ribalta y los ribaltescos: la evolución del estilo barroco en Valencia (1985), Diputación Provincial de Valencia 
 Pérez Sánchez, Alfonso E., Pintura barroca en España 1600-1750 (1992), Ediciones Cátedra S.A.

External links

 "El Museo de Bellas Artes restaurará otra pintura barroca de Vicente Castelló" from El País

1580s births
1636 deaths
Spanish painters
Spanish Baroque painters
Religious artists